Sosnovka is a village in the Jayyl District of Chüy Region of Kyrgyzstan. Its population was 5,972 in 2021. It is the center and the only village in Sosnovka rural community (ayyl aymagy). Bishkek - Osh road passes through Sosnovka.

Population

References

Populated places in Chüy Region